Negino is a rural locality (a selo) in Suzemsky District, Bryansk Oblast, Russia. The population was 412 as of 2013. There are 8 streets.

Geography 
Negino is located 10 km east of Suzemka (the district's administrative centre) by road. Nevdolsk is the nearest rural locality.

References 

Rural localities in Suzemsky District